Kryzhopil (Kryzhopol) is an urban-type settlement in Tulchyn Raion (district) of Vinnytsia Oblast (region). Before the 2020 reform, the settlement was an administrative centre of Kryzhopil Raion. Population:

History 
Kryzhopil was founded in 1866 during the construction of Kiev-Odessa railroad and named after village Krzyżopol, located 17 km from the modern settlement. Railway station started to operate in August 1870. Since foundation to 1923 the settlement was a part of Olgopolsky Uyezd of Podolian Governorate.

During World War II, Kryzhopil was occupied by Romanian forces and became a part of Transnistria Governorate. The settlement was liberated by the Red Army on 17 March 1944.

Notable people
Notable people that were born or lived in Kryzhopil include:
Sidor Belarsky (1898–1975), Ukrainian-American singer

References

Urban-type settlements in Tulchyn Raion
Olgopolsky Uyezd